"Cold Love" is a song by American singer Donna Summer, released as the second single from her album The Wanderer. The song was written by Harold Faltermeyer, Keith Forsey and Pete Bellotte and produced by Bellotte and Giorgio Moroder. It peaked at No. 33 in the Billboard Hot 100, and No. 49 in Cash Box. Summer earned a Grammy nomination for Best Female Rock Vocal Performance.

Vocally, this song contrasts with the just previous "The Wanderer" single release - it is very reminiscent of her 1979 disco hit "Hot Stuff" - power belt and hard rock approach. This style was currently in vogue in the early 1980s and used by female vocalists in groups such as Heart and in Pat Benatar's "Hit Me with Your Best Shot".

Track listing
7" vinyl single
"Cold Love" (Faltermeyer, Forsey, Bellotte) – 3:11
"Grand Illusion" (Donna Summer, Giorgio Moroder) – 3:51

12" vinyl single
"Cold Love" (Faltermeyer, Forsey, Bellotte) – 3:37
"Grand Illusion (Summer, Moroder) – 3:54

Charts

References

External links
 
 

1980 singles
Donna Summer songs
Songs written by Harold Faltermeyer
Songs written by Pete Bellotte
Songs written by Keith Forsey
Song recordings produced by Giorgio Moroder
Song recordings produced by Pete Bellotte
1980 songs
Geffen Records singles
American hard rock songs